The rural district of Castle Donington in Leicestershire, England, was formed in 1894 and abolished in 1974.  It was formed by the Local Government Act 1894 from the part of the Shadlow Rural Sanitary District that was in Leicestershire.

It gained a few parishes from the disbanding of Loughborough Rural District in the 1930s.  It included the following parishes at its abolition

Belton (from Loughborough RD)
Breedon on the Hill
Castle Donington
Charley (from Loughborough RD)
Diseworth
Hemington
Isley cum Langley
Kegworth
Lockington Hemington
Long Whatton (from Loughborough RD)

The district was merged into the North West Leicestershire district under the Local Government Act 1972.

Districts of England created by the Local Government Act 1894
Districts of England abolished by the Local Government Act 1972
History of Leicestershire
Rural districts of England